Aaltonen is a Finnish surname. Notable people with the surname include:

Aimo Aaltonen (1906–1987), Finnish communist politician
Ali Aaltonen (1884–1918), Lieutenant in the Imperial Russian army
Arvo Aaltonen (1892–1949), Finnish swimmer
Carina Aaltonen (born 1964), Finnish politician
Emil Aaltonen (1869–1949), Finnish industrialist and philanthropist
Erkki Aaltonen (1910–1990), Finnish composer
Jani Aaltonen (born 1990), Finnish footballer
Juhamatti Aaltonen (born 1985), Finnish ice hockey player
Juhani Aaltonen (born 1935), Finnish jazz musician
Lasse Aaltonen, Finnish World War II ace
Leevi Aaltonen (born 2001), Finnish ice hockey player
Mika Aaltonen (born 1965), former Finnish football (soccer) player
Mikael Aaltonen (born 1991), Finnish ice hockey player
Minna Aaltonen (born 1966), Finnish actress
Miro Aaltonen (born 1993), Finnish ice hockey player
Nico Aaltonen (born 1988), Finnish ice hockey player
Paavo Aaltonen (1919–1962), Finnish gymnast
Päivi Aaltonen (born 1952), Finnish female archer
Patrick Aaltonen (born 1994), Finnish footballer
Rauno Aaltonen (born 1938), Finnish former professional rally driver
Remu Aaltonen (born 1948), Finnish member of the Hurriganes rock band
Risto Aaltonen (born 1939), Finnish actor
Timo Aaltonen (born 1969), Finnish shot putter
Uma Aaltonen (1940–2009), Finnish author, journalist and former MEP
Veikko Aaltonen (born 1955), Finnish director, editor, sound editor, production manager and film and television writer and actor
Wäinö Aaltonen (1894–1966), Finnish artist and sculptor

Finnish-language surnames